Acando (previously AcandoFrontec) was a software, information technology, database and web design consulting firm based in Stockholm Sweden, also operating in Norway, Finland, Denmark and Germany. It counted around 4000 employees when it was acquired by CGI in 2019.

History
Founded in 1999, Acando provides consultancy in information technology and Software as a Service (SaaS).  As of March, 2008, AcandoFrontec services over 250 clients and employs over 30 people.

In 2004, AcandoFrontec acquired Edge Consulting. Edge Consulting was a software consulting firm founded in 1999, with 15 employees.

In 2006, Acando Frontec acquired Resco. The company renamed as Acando.

In 2014, Acando acquired Connecta with around 800 employees.

In 2019, Acando was acquired by CGI.

Services
Acando consulted with companies on information technology projects and Software-as-a-Service, and built software applications including web sites.

Acando was a reseller and integrator of NetSuite’s ERP/Customer Relationship Management (CRM) Software-as-a-Service applications. Acando was a Microsoft .NET solution provider and Oracle partner.

Acando provided consultancy in project leadership, analysis, design and development for software projects of any size. In addition to web design and software development, Explore also offers Business Intelligence (BI), Data Warehousing design and development and mobile systems design and development.

Awards and Industry Recognition
In 2007, Acando was named to the Inc. 5000, ranking 3,520 nationally, with a three-year average annual sales growth of 83.8%.

See also
 AccuSystems

References

External links
 Official website

Information technology consulting firms of Sweden
Software companies of Sweden
Companies based in Stockholm County